Ambassador Apartments may refer to:

Ambassador Apartments (Hartford, Connecticut)
Ambassador Apartments (Springfield, Missouri)
President and Ambassador Apartments, Lincoln, Nebraska
Ambassador Apartments (Portland, Oregon)

See also
Ambassador Hotel (disambiguation)